Crabtree Valley Mall is a regional shopping mall located in Raleigh, North Carolina.  At , it is the largest enclosed mall in the Research Triangle area.  Crabtree Valley contains over 200 stores and is anchored by Belk and Macy's. The mall is now managed by Pacific Retail Capital Partners.

History 

Crabtree Valley Mall opened in August 1972 at the intersection of US 70/NC 50 (Glenwood Avenue) and the I-440 Beltline. Original anchors were Hudson Belk, Sears, Miller & Rhoads and Thalhimer's.

From the start, the mall pulled shoppers from all over central and eastern North Carolina.  Many of them came to the  Hudson Belk, which is still the largest store in the complex and serves as a Belk flagship. The mall was remodeled in the mid-1980s and added many specialty stores and a food court.  It faced little competition in its market until the 1990s, when Cary Towne Center in nearby Cary doubled in size and spawned a companion mall, Crossroads Plaza.

In response Crabtree embarked on a major expansion starting in 1993.  G.C. Murphy, Miller & Rhoads, and Piccadilly all closed down during this period. Thalhimer's converted to Hecht's, and began planning for a new, larger location at the mall.  In 1993 a 40 by  section of the parking deck collapsed just three months after it had been completely rebuilt. Sears closed its Crabtree store in 1994 and opened a new location adjacent to it that August.  The old Sears became small shop space and connected to a new, larger Hecht's which opened in August 1995, and the former Thalhimer's/Hecht's became a Lord & Taylor which closed in 2006, and the upper level is now a Belk Men's store since 2007 and the lower level became more shops and an H&M in 2010.

Hecht's was replaced by Macy's in September 2006 as part of Federated Department Stores, Inc. absorbing The May Department Stores Company brands which also includes Hecht's after acquiring the company in 2005.

On August 22, 2018, Sears announced that its store would be closing as part of a plan to close 46 stores nationwide. The store closed on November 25, 2018. This left the mall with two remaining anchors Belk and Macy’s. In June 2019, it was announced that the former Sears space will be redeveloped into a 30 story tower. The cost estimates for the initial portion of the redevelopment project were cited at about $290 million, with expectations to create more than 1,300 jobs.

On July 5, 2019, a small fire burned in a Macy's fitting room. The sprinkler system extinguished the flames before firefighters arrived.

On July 25, 2022, the News and Observer reported that furniture stores Pottery Barn, Arhaus, and Williams and Sonoma have closed their stores at Crabtree due to the opening of Fenton, a new shopping center that recently opened in Cary, across the street from the defunct Cary Towne Center.

Crabtree Special Police  
Crabtree Valley Mall was the only mall in the Research Triangle area that had its own private police force. The force was sworn in under North Carolina General Statutes Chapter 74E, more commonly known as the Company Police Act, which gave them the power of arrest, and required them to be state certified officers as any municipal police agency. Crabtree Police officers were not allowed to carry firearms while on duty.

The force was disbanded in April 2020 after a change in mall management.

Flooding
Crabtree Valley Mall is situated in a low spot along Crabtree Creek, a tributary of the Neuse River that begins near Morrisville and winds through Umstead State Park as well as western and North Central Raleigh.  Because the watershed around the mall has become increasingly covered with impervious parking lots the creek floods easily following major storms. Such floods occurred frequently in the mall's early years, but diminished with the construction of Lake Crabtree and large retaining basins upstream of the mall. However, the problem has returned and lower levels are still likely to flood during heavy rains in the summer months.

Heavy rains caused by the remnants of Tropical Storm Alberto flooded the lower level parking lots of the mall on June 14, 2006, as well as a great deal of the bottom level of anchor stores, forcing the mall to close for the day. A similar situation occurred with Hurricane Fran in 1996, when flood waters flowed through the first floor of the mall and caused a few stores to remain closed for nearly two months.

The lower level of the parking structure along with small parts of the main building have also flooded in 2013, March 2016 and, on July 16, 2016 when during an intense storm Crabtree creek rose 8 feet, closing some roads that surround the mall and flooding parking lots. The storm left dozens stranded and cars flooded.

References

External links

 Crabtree Valley Mall

Shopping malls in Raleigh, North Carolina
Shopping malls established in 1972